Ruth Waithera Nganga (born August 17, 1958) is a retired sprinter from Kenya.

Waithera won bronze over 200 metres at the 1978 All-Africa games and 1979 African Championships. Waithera won twice three sprint events (100, 200 and 400 meters) at the East and Central African Championships; in 1977 and 1979.

She competed at the 1984 Summer Olympics, finishing 8th in 400 metres race and reaching 200 metres semifinals. She became the first African woman to reach 400 metres Olympic final. At the time she was studying at the University of Arizona and she won NCAA Division I Women's Indoor Championship in 400 metres in  1984. At the 2004 Kenyan championships she won three individual gold medals; 100, 200 and 400 metres.

Waithera still holds the Women's 400 metres Kenyan record, 51.56, set in 1984. In 2008 Elizabeth Muthuka broke the record, but tested positive for doping. Thus Waithera's record remains in force. As of 2008, Waithera remains also the latest Kenyan woman to compete 400 metres at the Olympics. Waithera is a former African record holder over 400 metres.

Waithera is from Shamata village. She was a member of the Kenya Air Force. She established the Avenue Sports Club in 1998 to give orphan children an opportunity to have a career in athletics. In 1990 she was awarded a membership of the Arizona Sports Hall of Fame.

She is not to be confused with a Kenyan steeplechase runner, born in 1990, who is also named Ruth Waithera.

Achievements

References

External links

1958 births
Living people
Kenyan female sprinters
Arizona Wildcats women's track and field athletes
Athletes (track and field) at the 1978 Commonwealth Games
Athletes (track and field) at the 1982 Commonwealth Games
Athletes (track and field) at the 1984 Summer Olympics
Olympic athletes of Kenya
Commonwealth Games competitors for Kenya
African Games bronze medalists for Kenya
African Games medalists in athletics (track and field)
Athletes (track and field) at the 1978 All-Africa Games
Olympic female sprinters
20th-century Kenyan women
21st-century Kenyan women